The 2001 World Aesthetic Gymnastics Championships, the 2nd edition of the Aesthetic group gymnastics competition, was held in Tallinn, Estonia from June 29 to 30, at the Kalev Sports Hall.

Participating nations

Results

References

External links
IFAGG site

World Aesthetic Gymnastics Championships
2001 in Estonian sport
2001 in gymnastics
Gymnastics competitions in Estonia
International sports competitions hosted by Estonia